The 1971 Paris–Roubaix was the 69th edition of the Paris–Roubaix cycle race and was held on 18 April 1971. The race started in Compiègne and finished in Roubaix. The race was won by Roger Rosiers of the Bic team.

General classification

References

Paris–Roubaix
Paris-Roubaix
Paris-Roubaix
Paris-Roubaix
Paris-Roubaix